Michel Macedo (born 23 September 1998) is a Brazilian alpine skier competing collegiately for Middlebury College. He competed in the 2018 Winter Olympics. On 17 February 2019, he had the best-result-ever by a Brazilian Alpine athlete with a 27.97 performance on the FIS Points List at the Dartmouth Carnival university race in New Hampshire (USA), according to the Brazilian Confederation of Snow Sports.  He qualified to represent Brazil at the 2022 Winter Olympics.  Macedo was unable to compete in the Men's Giant Slalom due to contracting COVID-19.

Olympic Results

2018

2022

References

1998 births
Living people
Sportspeople from Fortaleza
Alpine skiers at the 2018 Winter Olympics
Alpine skiers at the 2022 Winter Olympics
Brazilian male alpine skiers
Olympic alpine skiers of Brazil
Alpine skiers at the 2016 Winter Youth Olympics

Middlebury College alumni
Middlebury Panthers athletes
Middlebury College